Wilster is a town in Steinburg district in Schleswig-Holstein, Germany.

History
Wilster was granted town rights under Lübeck law in 1282, and thereby counts itself among Schleswig-Holstein's oldest towns. Wilster forms the centre of the Wilstermarsch, a major cattle raising area in Germany.

On 1 July 2005, the town administration and the Amt of Wilstermarsch merged into one authority.

In 2018, the transformers for the NordLink power cable were installed in Wilster.

Sightseeing
The Old Town Hall built in 1585 is among Schleswig-Holstein's finest preserved Renaissance buildings.

Moreover, the late Baroque St. Bartholomew's Church, built by Ernst Georg Sonnin between 1775 and 1781, and the New Town Hall (Doos'sche Palais) built in 1786 are also worth seeing.

Personalities
1571, 18 October, Wolfgang Ratke, died 27 April 1635 in Erfurt, didact and pedagogue.
1914, 11 February, Hans Hermann Junge, died 13 August 1944 in Normandy, SS-officer and Adolf Hitler's personal valet.
1943, 29 April, Klaus Grawe, died 10 July 2005 in Zurich, psychotherapy researcher and psychological psychotherapist.
 1965, 7 February, Birge Schade, actress

Gallery

References

External links
 Wilster.de

Towns in Schleswig-Holstein
Steinburg